Theodore Strickland (born August 4, 1941) is an American politician who was the 68th governor of Ohio, serving from 2007 to 2011. A member of the Democratic Party, he previously served in the United States House of Representatives, representing  (1993–1995, 1997–2007).

In the 2006 gubernatorial election, Strickland was elected to succeed term-limited Republican incumbent Bob Taft, receiving 60% of the vote and defeating Ohio Secretary of State Ken Blackwell. He was narrowly defeated for re-election in the 2010 gubernatorial election by former U.S. Representative John Kasich.

In April 2014, Strickland became president of the Center for American Progress Action Fund, a progressive public policy research and advocacy organization. Strickland left that position in February 2015, and on February 25, 2015, he announced his intention to run for the United States Senate against incumbent Rob Portman. Strickland lost by 20 points. , he is the last Democrat to serve as Governor of Ohio.

Early life
Strickland was born in Lucasville, Ohio, the son of Carrie (Carver) and Charles Orville Strickland. He was one of nine children. A 1959 graduate of Northwest High School, Strickland went on to be the first member of his family to attend college. Strickland received a Bachelor of Arts degree in history with a minor in psychology from Asbury College in 1963. In 1966, he received a Master of Arts degree in guidance counseling from the University of Kentucky and a Master of Divinity (M.Div.) from the Asbury Theological Seminary in 1967. He then returned to the University of Kentucky to earn his Ph.D. in counseling psychology in 1980. He is married to Frances Strickland, an educational psychologist.

Strickland worked as a counseling psychologist at the Southern Ohio Correctional Facility in Lucasville. He was an administrator at a Methodist children's home and was a professor of psychology at Shawnee State University. Strickland is an ordained minister in the United Methodist Church. He was a minister at a Methodist church in Portsmouth, Ohio.

Election to Congress

Strickland ran for U.S. representative for Ohio's 6th congressional district in 1976, 1978, and 1980, losing twice to long-time incumbent William H. Harsha and later to Harsha's successor and campaign manager, Bob McEwen.

Strickland ran again for the 6th District seat in 1992, once again facing Bob McEwen, who had suffered some political damage by being associated with the House banking scandal. The 6th District had been combined with the old 10th District when Ohio lost two seats in Congress following the 1990 census and now covered a huge area stretching from Lebanon, in Warren County, to Marietta, in Washington County on the opposite side of the state. The district proved a difficult place to campaign, representing half a dozen different media markets and home to no large cities and few unifying influences.

Patrick J. Buchanan, Vice President Dan Quayle, and Oliver North came to Ohio to campaign for McEwen, but Strickland narrowly won in the general election on November 3, 1992. He received 122,720 votes to McEwen's 119,252, a plurality of 3,468 – just over 1.4%. Strickland began serving in January 1993 in the 103rd Congress.

Congressional career
Strickland was among the many Democrats who lost their offices in the Republican surge of 1994, narrowly losing to businessman Frank Cremeans. Strickland reclaimed his seat two years later in a similarly narrow victory, and took office in January 1997 with the 105th Congress. He faced a strong challenge from Lieutenant Governor Nancy Hollister in 1998, but turned it back; in the next three elections he was reelected by large margins, running unopposed in 2004. Strickland served on the Energy and Commerce Committee and the Veterans' Affairs Committee.

2006 gubernatorial campaign

Strickland successfully ran for Governor of Ohio in 2006, when Governor Bob Taft was term-limited and could not run for re-election. Strickland selected former Ohio Attorney General and 1998 Democratic nominee for governor Lee Fisher as his running mate. He was sworn in as governor on January 8, 2007.
 
Strickland won the Democratic primary on May 2, 2006, with 80 percent of the vote.

Strickland's endorsements included the Fraternal Order of Police and the Ohio Federation of Teachers.

In September 2006, a group called Republicans for Strickland publicly announced their support for Strickland at a press conference.

In the November general election, he was challenged by Republican Secretary of State Ken Blackwell, Libertarian economist Bill Peirce and Green Bob Fitrakis. He won the general election on November 7, 2006, capturing 60% of the vote. Blackwell finished in second with 37% of the vote.

Governorship

Economy
In June 2007, Ohio lawmakers approved a $52 billion budget for fiscal year 2008-09. In January 2008, facing a revenue shortfall, Strickland ordered a $733 million reduction in state spending, including job cuts and the closure of state mental hospitals. Strickland cut another $540 million from the budget in September 2008. In December 2008, Strickland announced a $640 million budget gap. In 2009, Strickland signed legislation which postponed the last of five scheduled income tax rate reductions from 2009 until 2011. The move used $844 million in anticipated tax refunds to fill the gap in the state budget.

In 2008, he signed the state's renewable portfolio standard, mandating that 25% of the state's electricity be produced by renewables by 2025. That same year, Strickland signed an executive order overhauling business regulations. In 2010, Strickland supported the renewal of the Third Frontier program in 2010.

During Strickland's tenure, the state's rainy day fund was reduced from $1 billion to 89 cents in order to balance the state budget. Some estimates claim Ohio would have experienced a $7 billion deficit if Strickland hadn't made such moves and cuts to the Ohio budget.

Education
Strickland signed an executive order in 2007 that unified the state's higher education system by creating the University System of Ohio.

Strickland pushed to cut funding of school vouchers, which critics said would reduce educational choice available to the public. He opposed federally subsidized abstinence-only sex education programs.

Veterans' affairs

In 2007, Strickland signed legislation exempting military veterans' retirement benefits from state taxation. He signed an executive order creating a council to oversee the eventual establishment of the Ohio Department of Veterans Services as a cabinet-level agency. In 2008, he signed an executive order creating the Ohio G.I. Promise, which charges in-state tuition to all veterans attending the state's public colleges on the G.I. bill. In 2008, he vetoed legislation which would have given small cash bonuses to veterans of wars in the Persian Gulf, Iraq and Afghanistan from the state's rainy day fund.

Healthcare
Strickland signed an executive order requiring insurance companies to offer policyholders the option to add or keep unmarried children on their insurance policies up to age 28.

Social issues
On the issue of capital punishment, Strickland delayed three executions until further review and commuted five death sentences. Strickland chose not to commute three additional executions, including two that eventually occurred. The March 20, 2007 execution of Kenneth Biros, which Strickland did not commute, was later stayed by the United States Court of Appeals for the Sixth Circuit in Cincinnati. Biros was eventually executed in December 2009.

Strickland voted against partial-birth abortion while in the U.S. House.

Strickland signed Ohio's castle doctrine legislation in 2008, which established a presumption that a person acts in self-defense when shooting someone who unlawfully enters his or her home or occupied vehicle. The legislation was supported by the National Rifle Association.

Strickland held office when a constitutional amendment passed allowing casinos to be built in Cincinnati, Cleveland, Toledo and Columbus.  Although originally opposed to the idea of allowing such types of gambling into the state, potential revenue shortfalls caused him to consider the option. More so, the implementation of video lottery terminals at Ohio racetracks also was considered as a revenue source, and Strickland said for about a year that he would ask the courts to weigh in on whether the executive branch has the authority to implement slots through the Ohio Lottery Commission.

As governor in 2010, Strickland opposed legislation allowing the medical use of cannabis. After leaving office he reversed his stance on the issue, however, and later in 2015 stated his support for legalizing recreational use.

Theft of Ohio government computer backup tape
The theft of an Ohio government computer backup tape in June 2007 was widely reported in the media after authorities revealed that the tape contained names and Social Security numbers of 64,000 state employees, 84,000 welfare recipients, and tens of thousands of others. In the wake of the theft, Strickland issued an executive order to change the practices for handling state data.

Database searches of Joe the Plumber
Strickland's Director of the Ohio Department of Job and Family Services (ODJFS), Helen Jones-Kelley, was involved in the controversial Ohio database searches of Joe Wurzelbacher during the final weeks of the 2008 presidential campaign. She bore ultimate responsibility for the unauthorized background checks run on Wurzelbacher, an Ohio Republican known as Joe the Plumber. Jones-Kelley was suspended without pay by Strickland and investigated by the Ohio Attorney General. She resigned in December, and Strickland appointed Douglas E. Lumpkin to replace her.

Vice-presidential speculation

Strickland was mentioned as a possible Democratic Vice Presidential nominee in 2008. He denied that he would accept a position on the ticket if offered.

Strickland spoke on the second night of the 2008 Democratic National Convention. Journalists Peggy Noonan and David Remnick credited Strickland with delivering the best line of the convention: "You know, it was once said of the first George Bush that he was born on third base and thought he'd hit a triple. Well, with the 22 million new jobs and the budget surplus Bill Clinton left behind, George W. Bush came into office on third base and then he stole second. And John McCain cheered him every step of the way."

2010 gubernatorial campaign

Strickland sought re-election as governor in 2010. On January 19, 2010, he chose Yvette McGee Brown, a former juvenile court judge from central Ohio, as his running mate. Strickland faced Republican John Kasich and his running mate, Ohio State Auditor Mary Taylor, in the general election. Kasich defeated Strickland by two percentage points.

Post-gubernatorial career
In March 2011, Kasich signed Senate Bill 5, which was intended to curtail the collective bargaining rights of Ohio public employees. Strickland was involved in gathering the petition signatures necessary to warrant a public referendum. With over two million signatures, the petition put the Ohio Collective Bargaining Limit Repeal on the November 2011 ballot, where it passed with more than 60% of the vote.

Strickland became a resident fellow at the Harvard Institute of Politics in spring 2012. Strickland spoke on the first night of the 2012 Democratic National Convention in a speech against the policies of Republican nominee Mitt Romney.

President Obama nominated Strickland to be one of the alternate representatives to the United Nations in September 2013, but his confirmation was delayed through the end of the year by Republican opposition in the Senate.

In April 2014, Strickland became president of the Center for American Progress Action Fund, a progressive public policy research and advocacy organization. Strickland left that position in February 2015.

2012 DNC controversy
At the 2012 Democratic National Convention, where Antonio Villaraigosa was Chairman, the original 2012 party platform caused controversy after it was written, because the lack of typical invocations and references to God and God-given rights as well as lack of language affirming the role of Jerusalem as the capital of Israel. Both of these matters had been included in some previous platforms.  On the second day, September 5, former Ohio Governor Ted Strickland introduced an amendment on the floor of the convention to reinsert language invoking God and recognizing Jerusalem as Israel's capital. Convention Chairman Villaraigosa put the amendment to a voice vote requiring a two-thirds majority for passage. After the first vote was indecisive, Villaraigosa called for a second vote, which was again met with an equal volume of "ayes" and "nos". A woman standing to his left said, "You've got to rule, and then you've got to let them do what they're gonna do." Villaraigosa called a third vote with the same result. Villaraigosa then declared the amendment passed, causing an eruption of boos on the floor.

Political stances

Climate change
As Governor of Ohio, Ted Strickland worked to pass renewable energy legislation he says "helped address the issue of climate change." In 2013, he said "the debate on whether climate change exists is over. … The debate now must be focused on how climate change is affecting our communities." In 2015, he said "I believe climate change is a problem; we've got to transition."

2016 U.S. Senate election

On February 25, 2015, Strickland announced his intention to run for the United States Senate against incumbent Republican Rob Portman. On March 31, 2015, former President Bill Clinton endorsed Strickland. In September 2016, Strickland's campaign was reported to be increasingly faltering. With poor poll results against Portman, at least two major political action committees withdrew millions of dollars in funding for advertising for Strickland, choosing instead to focus on other major Senate races in which advertising was considered more likely to make a difference.

Strickland lost the 2016 general election by a large margin to Portman, 58%–37%.

Electoral history
{| class="wikitable" style="margin:0.5em ; font-size:95%"
|+ : Results 1976–1980, 1992–2004
!|Year
!
!|Democrat
!|Votes
!|Pct
!
!|Republican
!|Votes
!|Pct
!
!|3rd Party
!|Party
!|Votes
!|Pct
|-
|1976
|
| |Ted Strickland
| align="right" |67,067
| |39%
|
| |William H. Harsha
| align="right" |107,064
| |61%
|
|
|
|
|
|-
|1978
|
| |Ted Strickland
| align="right" |46,313
| |35%
|
| |William H. Harsha
| align="right" |85,592
| |65%
|
|
|
|
|
|-
|1980
|
| |Ted Strickland
| align="right" |84,235
| |45%
|
| |Robert D. McEwen
| align="right" |101,288
| |55%
|
|
|
|
|
|-
|1992
|
| |
| align="right" |122,720
| |51%
|
| |Robert D. McEwen
| align="right" |119,252
| |49%
|
|
|
|
|
|-
|1994
|
| |
| align="right" |87,861
| |49%
|
| |
| align="right" |91,263
| |51%
|
|
|
|
|
|-
|1996
|
| |Ted Strickland
| align="right" |118,003
| |51%
|
| |
| align="right" |111,907
| |49%
| |*
|
|
|
|
|-
|1998
|
| |Ted Strickland
| align="right" |102,852
| |57%
|
| |
| align="right" |77,711
| |43%
|
|
|
|
|
|-
|2000
|
| |Ted Strickland
| align="right" |138,849
| |58%
|
| |Mike Azinger
| align="right" |96,966
| |40%
|
| |Kenneth R. MacCutcheon
| |Libertarian
| align="right" |4,759
| align="right" |2%
|-
|2002
|
| |Ted Strickland
| align="right" |113,972
| |59%
|
| |Mike Halleck
| align="right" |77,643
| |41%
|
|
|
|
|
|-
|2004
|
| |Ted Strickland
| align="right" |223,842
| |100%
|
| |(no candidate)
| align="right" |
| |
| |*
|
|
|
|

*Write-in and minor candidate notes: In 1996, write-ins received 16 votes. In 2004, John Stephen Luchansky received 145 votes.

See also
 Ohio's 6th congressional district
 List of United States representatives from Ohio

References

External links

 Ted Strickland for Senate 
 

|-

|-

|-

|-

|-

1941 births
Asbury Theological Seminary alumni
Democratic Party governors of Ohio
Harvard Institute of Politics
Living people
People from Lucasville, Ohio
Shawnee State University
2008 United States presidential electors
2012 United States presidential electors
University of Kentucky alumni
20th-century American politicians
21st-century American politicians
American United Methodist clergy
John Kasich
People from Greater Columbus, Ohio
Democratic Party members of the United States House of Representatives from Ohio
Candidates in the 2016 United States Senate elections